The 1958 Eastern Illinois Panthers football team represented Eastern Illinois University as a member of the Interstate Intercollegiate Athletic Conference (IIAC) during the 1958 NCAA College Division football season. The team was led by second-year head coach Ralph Kohl and played their home games at Lincoln Field in Charleston, Illinois. The Panthers finished the season with a 2–6 record overall and a 1–5 record in conference play.

Schedule

References

Eastern Illinois
Eastern Illinois Panthers football seasons
Eastern Illinois Panthers football